Phillip Joseph Goodrum (born June 20, 1997) is an American soccer player who plays for Memphis 901 in the USL Championship.

Career

Youth and college 
Goodrum played four years of college soccer at the University of North Carolina Wilmington between 2016 and 2019, where he made 76 appearances, scoring 32 goals and tallied 15 assists.

While at college, Goodrum appeared for USL PDL sides North Carolina Fusion U23, Wilmington Hammerheads and Brazos Valley Cavalry.

Professional 
On January 13, 2020, Goodrum was selected 75th overall in the 2020 MLS SuperDraft by Atlanta United.  After signing with the club's USL Championship side Atlanta United 2, he then signed a short-term deal with the first team ahead of their upcoming CONCACAF Champions League game.

On January 14, 2022, Goodrum returned to his home state of Tennessee, signing with Memphis 901.

On March 7, 2023, Goodrum was reportedly “devastated” that his club, Memphis 901 FC, blocked potential moves to MLS and European clubs.

References

External links 
 Phillip Goodrum - Men's Soccer UNCW bio
 

1997 births
Living people
American soccer players
Association football forwards
Atlanta United FC draft picks
Wilmington Hammerheads FC players
Brazos Valley Cavalry FC players
Atlanta United 2 players
Atlanta United FC players
Memphis 901 FC players
UNC Wilmington Seahawks men's soccer players
Soccer players from Charlotte, North Carolina
USL Championship players
USL League Two players